Harold Gibbons may refer to:

Harold Gibbons (cricketer), English cricketer
Harold J. Gibbons, American labor leader